Qaleh-ye Hajj Mohammad Hoseyn (also Romanized as Qal‘eh-ye Ḩājj Moḩammad Ḩoseyn) is a village in Miyan Ab-e Shomali Rural District, in the Central District of Shushtar County, Khuzestan Province, Iran. At the 2006 census, its population was 24, in 5 families.

References 

Populated places in Shushtar County